Macedonian cuisine is the cuisine originating in the country of North Macedonia

Macedonian cuisine may also refer to:
 Macedonian cuisine (Greek), the cuisine originating in the Greek region of Macedonia
  Ancient Macedonian cuisine, the cuisine of the Ancient Greek kingdom of Macedonia